Rupert Percival Perrett (20 June 1909 – 16 January 1966) was an Australian rules footballer who played with North Melbourne and Collingwood in the Victorian Football League (VFL).

Notes

External links 

Rupe Perrett's profile at Collingwood Forever

1909 births
1966 deaths
Australian rules footballers from Victoria (Australia)
North Melbourne Football Club players
Collingwood Football Club players